Rule High School may refer to:

 Rule High School (Texas)
 Rule High School (Knoxville)